Jacques Pereira (3 February 1955 – 3 November 2020), known simply as Jacques, was a Portuguese professional footballer who played as a striker.

Football career
Born in Casablanca, Morocco to Portuguese parents, Jacques arrived in the Primeira Liga with S.C. Farense. After a spell in the second division with F.C. Famalicão, he returned to the top flight with S.C. Braga ahead of the 1979–80 campaign; his performances there attracted the attention of FC Porto, still without Fernando Gomes who had left for a two-year "exile" at Sporting de Gijón in Spain.

Jacques topped the scoring charts at 27 goals in his first season at the Estádio das Antas, although the team came out empty in silverware. Such performances earned him his sole cap for Portugal, which consisted of 45 minutes in a 5–2 friendly loss to Bulgaria in Haskovo.

Leaving Porto in 1985, barred by returned Gomes, Jacques returned to Braga on a two-year contract, then played one year with S.C. Covilhã also in the top tier. He eventually retired in 1994 at 39, after three years with Lusitano Futebol Clube – also his first club – and amateurs U.D. Castromarinense.

Death
Jacques died on 3 November 2020 in his home of Vila Real de Santo António, from heart failure. He was 65 years old.

References

External links

1955 births
2020 deaths
Footballers from Casablanca
Portuguese footballers
Association football forwards
Primeira Liga players
Liga Portugal 2 players
S.C. Farense players
F.C. Famalicão players
S.C. Braga players
FC Porto players
S.C. Covilhã players
Portugal under-21 international footballers
Portugal B international footballers
Portugal international footballers
Portuguese expatriates in Morocco